is a Japanese footballer who will play for Criacao Shinjuku from 2023.

Career
On 17 December 2022, Suzuki transferred to JFL club Criacao Shinjuku for the upcoming 2023 season, giving up on his announced retirement made in July of the same year.

Career statistics
Updated to the end of the 2022 season.

References

External links

Profile at Roasso Kumamoto

1992 births
Living people
Ryutsu Keizai University alumni
Association football people from Saitama Prefecture
Japanese footballers
J2 League players
J3 League players
Japan Football League players
Roasso Kumamoto players
Giravanz Kitakyushu players
Kataller Toyama players
Fukushima United FC players
Criacao Shinjuku players
Association football defenders